Rainer Osselmann (born 25 July 1960) is a former German water polo player who competed in the 1984 Summer Olympics and in the 1988 Summer Olympics.

Osselmann was born in Duisburg. His father, Friedrich Osselmann, played water polo for West Germany at the 1956 and 1960 Olympics, whereas his mother, Birgit Klomp, competed in swimming at the 1956 Games.

See also
 List of Olympic medalists in water polo (men)
 List of World Aquatics Championships medalists in water polo

References

External links
 

1960 births
Living people
German male water polo players
Olympic water polo players of West Germany
Water polo players at the 1984 Summer Olympics
Water polo players at the 1988 Summer Olympics
Olympic bronze medalists for West Germany
Olympic medalists in water polo
Sportspeople from Duisburg
Medalists at the 1984 Summer Olympics
20th-century German people